Wallace Hall may refer to:
Wallace Hall Academy, a secondary school in Scotland
Wallace L. Hall Jr., a member of the Board of Regents of the University of Texas System
Wallace Hall (Simpson College), Indianola, Iowa